The 1999 Liga Perdana 2 season is the second season of Liga Perdana 2. A total of ten teams participated in the season.

Selangor and Perlis were relegated from Liga Perdana 1 while TMFC and Kelantan TNB were promoted from Malaysia FAM League to a now increased total number of teams competing in the league from eight to become ten teams.

The season kicked off on 19 March 1999. Johor won the title and was promoted to Liga Perdana 1 alongside Selangor.

Teams

Ten teams competing in the second season of Liga Perdana 2.

 Johor (1999 Liga Perdana 2 champions)
 Selangor
 Johor FC
 Perlis
 Kelantan
 Malacca
 ATM
 TMFC
 NS Chempaka
 Kelantan TNB

League table

1.Johor  - 38 PTS (1999 Liga Perdana 2 Champions)

2.Selangor  - 37 PTS (Promoted to Liga Perdana 1)

3.Johor FC  - 33 PTS 

4.Perlis  - 31 PTS (Promoted to Liga Perdana 1)

5.Kelantan  - 29 PTS

6.Malacca  - 26 PTS

7.ATM  - 25 PTS

8.TMFC  - 24 PTS

9.NS Chempaka  - 14 PTS

10.Kelantan TNB  - 13 PTS

Champions

References

Liga Perdana 2 seasons
1
Malaysia